Boogie Down!  is the fourth album by former Temptations vocalist Eddie Kendricks, released in early 1974 on the Tamla imprint of Motown Records.

Reception
The Allmusic review by Jason Elias awarded the album 4 stars stating "Boogie Down cut for cut is Kendricks' strongest album.".

Track listing
"The Thin Man" (Anita Poree, Frank Wilson, Leonard Caston)  3:40
"Tell Her Love Has Felt the Need" (Kathy Wakefield, Leonard Caston)  4:30
"Son of Sagittarius" (Anita Poree, Frank Wilson, Leonard Caston)  3:41
"Boogie Down" (Anita Poree, Frank Wilson, Leonard Caston)  7:07 
"Hooked on Your Love" (Don Daniels, Frank Wilson, Terri McFaddin) 
"Honey Brown" (Don Daniels, Frank Wilson, Terri McFaddin)  5:18
"You Are the Melody of My Life" (Don Daniels, Terri McFaddin)  4:00 
"Trust Your Heart" (Frank Wilson, Leonard Caston, Terri McFaddin)  4:13
"Girl of My Dreams" (Kathy Wakefield, Leonard Caston)  3:28 
"Loving You the Second Time Around" (Frank Wilson, Leonard Caston, Pam Sawyer)  3:12

Personnel
Eddie Kendricks - lead and backing vocals
Melvin "Wah-Wah" Ragin, Greg Poree, Dean Parks, Dennis Coffey - guitar
Jack Ashford - tambourine, percussion
King Errisson - congas
Gary Coleman - percussion, vibes, timpani
James Jamerson, Darrell Clayborne - bass
Harold Johnson - organ, electric piano
Kenny Rice, Ed Greene, James Gadson, Gene Pello, Aaron Smith, Roger Bethelmy - drums
Jerry Peters - keyboards
Mike Campbell - harmonica
Leonard Caston - clavinet, piano, organ, other keyboards

Production 

 Frank Wilson, Leonard Caston - producer
 Frank Wilson, Leonard Caston, Dave Van De Pitte, James Carmichael - arrangements
 James Carmichael, Dave Van De Pitte, Leonard Caston - orchestration
 Russ Terrana, Art Stewart, Cal Harris, Andrew Berliner - recording engineers
 Frank Wilson, Andrew Berliner - mixing engineers
 Lynn Allen - coordination, inspiration
 Jim Britt - design, photography

Charts

Singles

References

External links
 Eddie Kendricks-Boogie Down! at Discogs

1974 albums
Eddie Kendricks albums
Tamla Records albums
Albums produced by Frank Wilson (musician)